The 1st Army Division is a unit of the Argentine Army.

Organization 

 1st Army Division, in Curuzú Cuatiá
 II Armored Brigade, in Paraná
 III Bush Brigade, in Resistencia
 XII Bush Brigade, in Posadas

See also 

 2nd Army Division (Argentina)
 3rd Army Division (Argentina)

References

External links 
 argentina.gob.ar/ejercito

Army units and formations of Argentina